Serena Williams was the defending champion, but lost to her sister Venus in the semifinals.

Agnieszka Radwańska won the title, defeating Venus Williams in the final, 6–4, 6–2.

Seeds
The top eight seeds received a bye into the second round.

Draw

Finals

Top half

Section 1

Section 2

Bottom half

Section 3

Section 4

Qualifying

Seeds

Qualifiers

Lucky losers

Qualifying draw

First qualifier

Second qualifier

Third qualifier

Fourth qualifier

Fifth qualifier

Sixth qualifier

Seventh qualifier

Eighth qualifier

Ninth qualifier

Tenth qualifier

Eleventh qualifier

Twelfth qualifier

References
General

Main Draw
Qualifying Draw

Specific

Rogers Cup
2014 Rogers Cup
Rogers